Julius Brandt (5 March 1873, in Olmütz – 26 December 1949, in Vienna) was an Austrian stage and film actor, film director and screenwriter.

Selected filmography
 The Gentleman Without a Residence (1915)
 Pogrom (1919)
 The Prisoner (1920)
 Diamonds (1920)
 Weib und Palette (1921)
 About the Son (1921)
 The Vulture Wally (1921)
 La Boheme (1923)
 The Ancient Law (1923)
 The Gentleman Without a Residence (1925)
 Die Geliebte des Gouverneurs (1927)
 The Weavers (1927)
 Behind the Altar (1927)
 Autumn on the Rhine (1928)
 Rustle of Spring (1929)
 Two Worlds (1930)
 The Virtuous Sinner (1931)
 Mary (1931)
 One Hour of Happiness (1931)
 My Wife, the Impostor (1931)
 Cruiser Emden (1932)
 The White Demon (1932)
 Grandstand for General Staff (1932)
 Three from the Unemployment Office (1932)
 The Gentleman from Maxim's (1933)
 The Young Baron Neuhaus (1934)
 Victoria in Dover (1936)
 The Night With the Emperor (1936)
 A Wedding Dream (1936)
 Such Great Foolishness (1937)
 Darling of the Sailors (1937)
 Comrades at Sea (1938)
 The Scoundrel (1939)
 Immortal Waltz (1939)
 Falstaff in Vienna (1940)
 A Salzburg Comedy (1943)
 It's Only Love (1947)
 Lambert Feels Threatened (1949)
 Dear Friend (1949)

External links

1873 births
1949 deaths
Austrian male film actors
Austrian male silent film actors
Austrian male stage actors
20th-century Austrian screenwriters
20th-century Austrian male writers
Austrian film directors
Actors from Olomouc
19th-century Austrian male actors
20th-century Austrian male actors
Film directors from Vienna
Male actors from the Austro-Hungarian Empire